is a sports  stadium used primarily for football. The stadium is in Fukuroi City, Shizuoka Prefecture, Japan, although the stadium itself is merely the centrepiece of the larger Ogasayama Sports Park which extends into neighbouring Kakegawa. The stadium's capacity is 50,889. It is now the primary venue for major sporting events in Shizuoka Prefecture, including track and field, for which it is fully equipped.

Usage
Shizuoka Stadium opened in 2001 and hosted its first major event on May 12th 2001, which was the Shizuoka Derby J. League match between Shimizu S-Pulse and Júbilo Iwata. A record crowd of 52,959 saw an extra time 1-0 victory for Shimizu.

Ecopa continues to be the venue for Júbilo Iwata's more high-profile games, including the Shizuoka Derby. Shimizu S-Pulse have not used the stadium for a home league since 2015.

In recent years Ecopa has also been home to one semifinal match of the Emperor's Cup, sharing the duty with the Kasumigaoka in Tokyo, although due to its isolation and the fact that both semifinals are held at the same time, Ecopa usually has less attendance.

The stadium played host to some matches during the 2002 FIFA World Cup, including Belgium versus Russia in the group stage (which Belgium won 3–2) and the quarter-final match between Brazil and England, which Brazil won 2–1.

It hosted the 2003 58th National Sports Festival of Japan main stadium.

The stadium was used as one of the venues for 2019 Rugby World Cup (Japan) which was the first Rugby World Cup to be held in Asia.

Next to the stadium is the indoor Ecopa Arena which is used for various performances and shows.

Access
Aino Station was constructed at the same time as the stadium and is a fifteen-minute walk from the stadium. Aino Station is four minutes west of Kakegawa Station, the nearest Shinkansen station to Ecopa. When the stadium is used for J. League or international fixtures, shuttle buses run from Kakegawa station to the stadium.

The walk from Aino Station to the stadium is notable for the sixteen works of art which line the route. These were commissioned to commemorate the 2002 World Cup, with each art piece being designed by an artist from a previous host of the competition.

2002 FIFA World Cup matches
The following matches were played at Shizuoka Stadium during the 2002 World Cup:

2019 Rugby World Cup matches
The following matches were played at Shizuoka Stadium during the 2019 Rugby World Cup:

References

External links
 Official site of Ecopa 

2002 FIFA World Cup stadiums in Japan
Football venues in Japan
Rugby union stadiums in Japan
Athletics (track and field) venues in Japan
Shimizu S-Pulse
Júbilo Iwata
Sports venues in Shizuoka Prefecture
Sports venues completed in 2001
Fukuroi, Shizuoka
2001 establishments in Japan